William James Harding (19 September 1826 – 13 May 1899) was a New Zealand photographer.

Harding was born in Southampton, Hampshire, England on 19 September 1826, one of eight children.

On 3 September 1853 Harding married Annie Baker at the New Christian Church in Argyle Square, London. At that time he was a coachbuilder. They were to have eight children.

William and Annie Harding arrived in New Zealand in 1855. Two brothers had already emigrated – John in 1842 and Thomas in 1848. The three brothers, and Annie, were followers of Emanuel Swedenborg, and strong supporters of the Total Abstinence Society. William and Annie settled in Wanganui, where William set up briefly as a cabinet-maker but in 1856 established a photographic studio. By the 1860s his studio was installed in a two-storeyed, corrugated-iron building on Ridgway Street.

Harding died on 13 May 1899, aged 72, in Sydney, New South Wales, Australia.

References

1826 births
1899 deaths
New Zealand photographers
English emigrants to New Zealand